America Mappillai  is a 2018 Tamil-language web television series, starring Raja Krishnamoorthy, Leela Samson, Arjun Chidambaram, Namita Krishnamurthy, Rakesh Ram and Gokul Anand. It premiered on ZEE5 from 2018. The show was writer by Raja Ramamurthy and director by Praveen Padmanabhan.

Synopsis
Ganesh is a young man who his father constantly nags to get married. His gay friend suggests that Ganesh pretend to be gay so as to avoid marriage. Ganesh acts out the plan but there are unintended consequences.

Cast
 Raja Krishnamoorthy
 Leela Samson as Vasantha
 Arjun Chidambaram as Ganesh
 Namita Krishnamurthy
 Gokul Anand as Karthik
 Rakesh Ram
 Delhi Ganesh

Special appearances 
M. S. Bhaskar
Sruthi Hariharan

Episodes

Reception 
The News Minute reviewed America Mappillai as a light hearted and funny webseries. They also stated that it was hard to understand the characters due to lack of time to elaborate more about the individuals. The series takes on the Indian obsession of marriages and caste differences. Anyhow, the format of the series is easy to understand.

The Indian Express gave a review of the series stating that the story is quite interesting but some moments portrayed in the series feel stagey and unnatural. The episodes in the web series are named after colours in an ode to its queer story, with minimal music. Some moments throughout the series don’t have any sound, however, the silence in those scenes was brilliant. The overall performance of the actors in America Mappillai was good.

A Pot Pourri Of Vestiges  reviewed by stating that the series has an interesting perspective on marriages in India. America Mallipai overturns all the stereotypes making the series a worthy addition to binge-watch all eight episodes in one go. The director of the series Praveen Padmanabhan has done a great job in bringing out the right kind of performances from all the actors.

References

External links

America Mappillai on ZEE5

ZEE5 original programming
Tamil-language web series
Tamil-language comedy television series
Tamil-language LGBT-related television shows
2018 Tamil-language television series debuts
2018 Tamil-language television series endings